The Cenarchaeaceae are a family of the Archaea order, the Cenarchaeales.

References

Further reading

Scientific journals

Scientific books

Scientific databases

External links

Archaea taxonomic families
Thermoproteota

es:Cenarchaeaceae